Yarema Kavatsiv (born 10 February 1986 in Yablunivka, Stryi Raion, Lviv Oblast, Ukrainian SSR) is a professional Ukrainian football defender.

Honours
Veres Rivne
 Ukrainian First League: 2016–17

Zirka Kropyvnytskyi
 Ukrainian First League: 2015–16

Desna Chernihiv
 Ukrainian Second League: 2012–13

Rava Rava-Ruska
 Ukrainian Second League: 2004–05

Metalurh Zaporizhzhia
 Ukrainian Cup: Runner up 2005–06

References

External links
Profile on Official FC Lviv Website
Profile on EUFO
Profile on Football Squads

1986 births
Living people
Ukrainian footballers
FC Rava Rava-Ruska players
FC Metalurh Zaporizhzhia players
FC Metalurh-2 Zaporizhzhia players
FC Lviv players
FC Mariupol players
FC Feniks-Illichovets Kalinine players
FC Desna Chernihiv players
FC Zirka Kropyvnytskyi players
FC Urartu players
Ukrainian expatriate footballers
Expatriate footballers in Armenia
Ukrainian expatriate sportspeople in Armenia
Armenian Premier League players
Ukrainian Premier League players
NK Veres Rivne players
Association football forwards
Sportspeople from Lviv Oblast